Chippewa Township is the name of some places in the U.S. state of Michigan:

 Chippewa Township, Chippewa County, Michigan
 Chippewa Township, Isabella County, Michigan
 Chippewa Township, Mecosta County, Michigan

See also 
 Chippewa Township (disambiguation)

Michigan township disambiguation pages